Lui è peggio di me (He is worse than me) is a 1984 Italian comedy film directed by Enrico Oldoini.

Plot
Leonardo and Luciano are two forty-year bachelors, lifelong friends. Holders of a company that rents vintage cars, are doing well and is easy to grant all the girls they want. The solid friendship goes up in smoke when Leonardo falls in love with Giovanna.

Cast 

 Adriano Celentano: Leonardo
 Renato Pozzetto: Luciano
 Kelly Van der Velden: Giovanna
 Daniel Stephen: Cowboy Roy

Reception
The film was the seventh highest-grossing film in Italy for the year with a gross of $1.6 million (3.2 billion lire) from 12 key cities and the third highest-grossing local film, behind Nothing Left to Do But Cry and I due carabinieri.

References

External links

Lui è peggio di me at Variety Distribution

1985 films
Italian buddy comedy films
1980s buddy comedy films
Films directed by Enrico Oldoini
Films scored by Manuel De Sica
1985 comedy films
1980s Italian-language films
1980s Italian films